Muguruza is a Basque surname. Notable people with the surname include:

 Fermin Muguruza, Spanish rock musician, singer, songwriter, producer, and record label manager
 Garbiñe Muguruza (born 1993), Spanish-Venezuelan tennis player
 Joseba Muguruza, Spanish footballer
 Josu Muguruza (1958–1989), Basque-origin Spanish journalist and politician

Basque-language surnames